The Molise regional election of 1970 took place on 7–8 June 1970.

Events
Christian Democracy was by far the largest party, gaining more than three times the share of vote of the Italian Communist Party, which came distantly second.

After the election Christian Democrat Carlo Vitale was elected President of the Region. In 1973 Vitale was replaced by Giustino D'Uva.

Results

Source: Ministry of the Interior

1970 elections in Italy
Elections in Molise
June 1970 events in Europe